Jai Arrow (born 12 July 1995) is an Australian professional rugby league footballer who plays as a er,  and  for the South Sydney Rabbitohs in the NRL

He previously played for the Brisbane Broncos and Gold Coast Titans in the National Rugby League. He has represented the Prime Minister's XIII and the Queensland Maroons in the State of Origin series.

Background
Arrow was born in Fairfield, Queensland, Australia.

He played his junior rugby league for Palm Beach State Primary winning the Metropolitan Cup. Then heading to Burleigh Bears, before being signed by the Brisbane Broncos.

Playing career

Early career
From 2012 to 2015, Arrow played for the Brisbane Broncos' National Youth Competition team. In August 2012, he played for the Australian Schoolboys. Towards the end of the 2014 season, he re-signed with the Broncos on a 3-year contract. In 2015, he captained the Broncos' NYC side. On 2 May 2015, he played for the Junior Kangaroos against Junior Kiwis. On 8 July 2015, he played for the Queensland under-20s team against the New South Wales under-20s team. On 14 September 2015, he was named at lock in the 2015 NYC Team of the Year.

2016
In 2016, Arrow graduated to the Broncos' Queensland Cup team, Norths Devils. On 8 May, he played for the Queensland Residents against the New South Wales Residents. In round 10 of the 2016 NRL season, he made his NRL debut for the Broncos against the Manly Warringah Sea Eagles. In round 25 of 2016 NRL season, Arrow scored his first NRL try for the Broncos in the 26—16 win over the Melbourne Storm at AAMI Park.

2017
In August, he signed a three-year contract with the Gold Coast Titans starting in 2018. He played 10 matches for the Brisbane in the 2017 NRL season.

2018
In round 1, Arrow made his debut for the Gold Coast against the Canberra Raiders in the 30—28 win at Robina Stadium. In round 5 of the 2018 NRL season, Arrow scored his first 2 club tries for the Titans in a 32—20 win over the Manly Warringah Sea Eagles at Marley Brown Oval.

2019
Arrow made a total of 17 appearances for the Gold Coast in the 2019 NRL season as the club endured a horror year on the field finishing last.

On 30 September, Arrow was named a squad member for the Australian PM's XIII side. On 7 October, Arrow was named in the Australian side for the 2019 Rugby League World Cup 9s. On 24 December, Arrow signed a $3.2 million, four-year contract to play for South Sydney starting in 2021.

2020
Arrow played 18 games for the Gold Coast in the 2020 NRL season as the club finished ninth on the table and missed the finals.

2021
In round 1 of the 2021 NRL season, he made his club debut for South Sydney in a 18-26 loss against Melbourne at AAMI Park.

In round 10, he scored his first try for South Sydney in a 32-22 victory over Cronulla-Sutherland.
Arrow played a total of 23 games for South Sydney in the 2021 NRL season including the club's 2021 NRL Grand Final defeat against Penrith.  Arrow was taken off in the first half of the game after being hit in a high tackle by Penrith's Viliame Kikau.  Arrow took no further part in the second half of the game after failing a HIA assessment.

2022
Arrow played 26 games for South Sydney in the 2022 NRL season including all three of the clubs finals matches as they reached the preliminary final for a fifth straight season.  Souths would lose in the preliminary final to eventual premiers Penrith 32-12.

Controversy
On 7 July 2021, Arrow was fined $35,000 by the NRL and suspended from playing in game 3 of the 2021 State of Origin series for Queensland after breaking the code's strict Covid-19 bio security protocols. It is alleged that Arrow brought "an unregistered guest" later revealed to be a woman into the team hotel.

References

External links
Gold Coast Titans profile
NRL profile

1995 births
Living people
Australian rugby league players
Queensland Rugby League State of Origin players
Brisbane Broncos players
Gold Coast Titans players
South Sydney Rabbitohs players
Junior Kangaroos players
Burleigh Bears players
Rugby league locks
Norths Devils players
Rugby league props
Rugby league players from Brisbane